A Farewell to Dragons is a role-playing video game by Russian studio Arise first released on February 19, 2010 for Microsoft Windows. The game is an adaptation of a Russian language fantasy novel by Sergey Lukyanenko and Nick Perumov titled "Не время для драконов" (translated as "Not the Time for Dragons").

References

2010 video games
Role-playing video games
Video games based on novels
Video games developed in Russia
Windows games
Windows-only games